Michael McGovern may refer to:

Michael McGovern (footballer) (born 1984), association football player from Northern Ireland
Michael McGovern (poet) (1848–1933), Irish-American poet
Michael G. McGovern (born 1964), American Catholic bishop